The FIL World Luge Natural Track Championships 1979 took place in Inzing, Austria.

Men's singles

Women's singles

Men's doubles

Medal table

References
Men's doubles natural track World Champions
Men's singles natural track World Champions
Women's singles natural track World Champions

FIL World Luge Natural Track Championships
Sport in Tyrol (state)
1979 in luge
1979 in Austrian sport
Luge in Austria